The Broken Strings Tour is the first live album from Australian alternative/rock group, Birds of Tokyo. The album was released as a double CD/DVD on 5 February 2010 and it debuted and peaked at number 11 on the Australian ARIA Charts.

At the ARIA Music Awards of 2010, the DVD was nominated for Best Music DVD but lost to Sound Relief by Various Artists.

Background and Recording
In 2009 Birds of Tokyo came up with an idea to show Australian audiences a very different and unexpected side to the band. They stripped their music back to the barest framework then rebuilt it with acoustic based sounds and delicate orchestration.

It was with this sound that Birds Of Tokyo took their Broken Strings show on the road performing to sold out venues across Australia. The band working closely with renowned producer, composer and long-time collaborator, Anthony Cormican.  Wanting the experience to be more daring and involved than merely picking up acoustic guitars and brushes instead of running with amplifiers and drum sticks; the band performed with a host of instruments - from ukuleles to 12-string guitars specifically incorporating them into an ensemble of string quartet and grand pianist. The album was recorded at The Enmore Theatre on 14 November 2009 and the Melbourne Town Hall on 15 November 2009.

The album was announced on 4 January 2010.

Reception

Jenny Meagher from Music Feeds gave the album 4 out of 5 saying: "I am certain had I been sitting there watching this show live at the Enmore Theatre, I would have shed a tear. "

Track listing
CD1
 "Overture" - 2:58
 "Armour For Liars" - 4:36
 "Like Rain" - 4:35
 "Russian Roulette" - 3:56
 "Black Sheets" - 3:56
 "Rose" - 3:35
 "Wild Eyed Boy" - 3:03
 "The Bakers Son" - 7:19

CD2
 "I Heard it Through the Grapevine" - 4:27
 "Head In My Hands" - 5:11
 "Train Wrecks" - 4:58
 "Violet" - 4:16
 "Rest Here My Brother" - 4:19
 "Off Kilter"	- 3:48
 "Wayside" - 4:56
 "Broken Bones" - 5:05
 "Medicine" - 4:25
 "Silhouettic" - 4:10

DVD
The DVD features footage of all songs listed above (excluding Heard it Through the Grapevine) as well as interviews with the band members and string composer/arranger Anthony Cormican.

Charts

Release history

References

MGM Records albums
Self-released albums
2010 live albums
Live albums by Australian artists